Sanhedrin 1994–1997 is a 2005 double album by John Zorn's Masada featuring previously unreleased studio recordings.

Reception
The Allmusic review by Sean Westergaard awarded the album 4 stars stating "This band has become one of the finest jazz ensembles of the last several decades, and there will probably come a time when folks will be drooling over any previously unreleased scraps the same way they do today over lost Monk and Coltrane recordings. The improvisations and interactions -- not to mention the dynamics -- can change from one performance to the next, and it's interesting to hear how these players approach the tunes on different takes. The package is lovely, with liner notes from all the bandmembers, and, of course, the playing is phenomenal".

Track listing
All compositions by John Zorn.
Disc One
 "Piram" – 6:22
 "Lebaoth" – 6:08
 "Idalah Abal" – 7:38
 "Midbar" – 5:06
 "Zelah" – 4:27
 "Katzatz" – 2:20
 "Abidan" – 6:53
 "Hekhal" – 3:07
 "Tannaim" – 8:34
 "Nefesh" – 5:40
 "Neshamah" – 7:15
 "Lakom" – 3:46
 "Tiferet" – 5:33
 "Evel" – 5:42
Disc Two 
 "Hath Arob" – 3:33 
 "Mahshav" – 6:06
 "Zemer" – 2:36 
 "Ne'Eman" – 8:46
 "Meholalot" – 7:11 
 "Kochot" – 5:19
 "Jachin" – 4:46
 "Moshav" – 7:26
 "Acharei Mot" – 8:50 
 "Kilayim" – 3:08
 "Otiot" – 3:44
 "Nashim" – 3:50
 "Karet" – 1:25
 "Hashmal" – 3:21
 "Ruach" – 5:28
Disc 1, Tracks 1-5 Recorded Feb. 20, 1994 
Disc 1, Tracks 6-10 Recorded Jun. 22, 1994 
Disc 1, Tracks 11-13 Recorded Jul. 16-17, 1995 
Disc 1, Track 14 and Disc 2, Tracks 1-3 Recorded Apr. 16, 1996 
Disc 2, Track 4 Recorded Aug. 1, 1996 
Disc 2, Tracks 5-9 Recorded Apr. 21, 1997 
Disc 2, Tracks 10-15 Recorded Sep. 15, 1997
Produced by John Zorn and Kazunori Sugiyama

Personnel
John Zorn – alto saxophone
Dave Douglas – trumpet
Greg Cohen – bass
Joey Baron – drums

References

2005 albums
Masada (band) albums
Albums produced by John Zorn
Tzadik Records albums